The Peaceful Unification Advisory Council is the constitutional organization, established in accordance with the Article 92 of the Constitution of the Republic of Korea and the National Unification Advisory Council Act (Korea) to advise the President of South Korea on the formulation of peaceful unification policy. This had been organized in October 1980.

The Chairperson of the Council is the President of South Korea and the Executive Vice-Chairperson is a minister-levelled officer.

Upon the inauguration of the new executive vice-person, the organisation changed its English name from NUAC to PUAC, The Peaceful Unification Advisory Council.

In 2017, the 18th National Unification Advisory Council was launched.

History
The National Unification Advisory Council is established at 27 October 1980 as Advisory Council on Peaceful Unification Policy. The Act of the Advisory Council on Peaceful Unification Policy (Act No. 3383) was promulgated on 14 March 1981. The Secretariat of the Advisory Council on Peaceful Unification Policy was established on 7 April 1981. The 1st Advisory Council on Peaceful Unification Policy was launched on 5 June 1981.

The Advisory Council on Peaceful Unification Policy was renamed into National Unification Advisory Council as Article 92 of the Constitution on 29 October 1988. The National Unification Advisory Council Act (Act No. 4000, partially amended) was promulgated on 17 February 1988. The 16th NUAC was launched on 1 July 2013. The 17th NUAC was launched on 1 July 2015.

Main Function
The Peaceful Unification Advisory Council advises by request and makes proposals to the President of the Republic of Korea regarding policy development and implementation for a democratic and peaceful inter-Korean unification. The function of Peaceful Unification Advisory Council are:
 Gathering public opinion in Korea and foreign countries concerning unification
 Gathering the national consensus concerning unification
 Focusing the nation's intent and capacity concerning unification
 Other matters necessary for advising and making recommendations on the President's policies for peaceful unification.

Composition and Activities
Peaceful Unification Advisory Council members are appointed by President of the Republic of Korea to represent the national aspiration and determination towards a democratic and peaceful unification on the Korean Peninsula. The members comes from local representatives elected by local residents, and the representatives of political parties, functional organizations, major social groups and overseas Korean communities. In particular, with the balanced participation of local assembly persons elected by local citizens and leading figures from every corner of the Korean community at home and abroad, the NUAC serves as a truly nationwide, non-partisan organization, encompassing every region, class, political affiliation and generation.

Appointment Procedure
Peaceful Unification Advisory Council members are appointed by President of the Republic of Korea on recommendations from those stipulated by the NUAC Act and the Enforcement Decree. NUAC members is grouped into three groups, those are local representatives, functional representatives and overseas representatives. Local Representatives members are Local Assemblypersons elected by local residents which recommended by Secretary General of the NUAC. Functional Representatives are group of leaders of each city, province, county and district, five North Korean province representatives, leaders recommended by chairpersons of political parties or a National Assembly member, representatives of major social and vocational organizations, and other persons who have contributed to or are capable of contributing to carrying out unification duties. Overseas representatives are recommended by heads of relevant diplomatic offices.

17th Council
17th Council is in term from July 1, 2015 to June 30, 2017 for two years. The 17th Council members are 19,947 persons in total, 13,512 functional representatives, 3,157 local representatives and 3,278 overseas representatives from 117 countries. 17th Council Objective is "to build the foundation for the peaceful unification of the Korean Peninsula based on free democratic fundamental order as set forth in the constitution and build a Unified Korea where 80 million Korean people are happy based on peaceful unification".

See also
Ministry of Unification
Foreign relations of South Korea
Division of Korea
Minister of Intra-German Relations

References

Government agencies of South Korea
North Korea–South Korea relations